Bizimana Aboubakar Karume (born 7 December 1989), better known by his stage name SAT-B, is a Burundian recording artist, singer, songwriter, dancer, and performer. Sat-B is the CEO of Empire Avenue, a music management label.

History
Sat-B was born and raised in Bujumbura, Burundi.

Discography

EP
Romantic Sounds

Albums
Inkuru y'Ukuri (2010)
IWACU (2016)
Hello Afrika (2022)

Singles

"Nyanzobe"
"Reka Mbege"
"Simba Hawana Meno"
"Nyandika"
"Maisha"
"Akabeba"
"Walimwengu"
"Satura Amabafle"
"Wezere" featuring Big Fizzo
"Urankirigita" featuring Urban Boyz
"Kanitangaze"
 "I Love You" ft Urban Boyz
"Rwagiye He?"
 "ShimirImana"
"Ivyo Bintu" ft Magic Washington
"Feel Love"
"No Love"
"Karabarya"
"Amabuno" ft Best Life Music, Belle 9ice, Bain Turo & Clémentine Kavy
"Love Controller"
"Don’t Cry" ft Aslay
"Umubabaro"
"Sukamwo"
"Izina"
"Gacugere ft Bain Turo"
"Izina Remix ft Fabelove, Chriss Eazy, AoBeats & Bain Turo"
"Forgive Me"
"Huge Me" ft Otile Brown

Music videos
{| class="wikitable plainrowheaders" style="text-align:center;"
|+ List of music videos with directors, showing year released
! scope="col" style="width:21em;" | Title
! scope="col" | Year
! scope="col" | Director(s)
|-
! scope="row"| "Ikinyamugigima"
| rowspan="1"| 2012
| Hugues Bana & Kent-P
|-
! scope="row"| "FreeStyle"
| rowspan="1"| 2013
| Kent-P
|-
! scope="row"| "Nyandika"
| rowspan="2"| 2014
| Camino Rwanda
|-
! scope="row"| "Satura Amabafle"
| Kent-P
|-
! scope="row"| "Impemburo"
| rowspan="1"| 2015
| Kent-P
|-
! scope="row"| "Generation Moto Moto ft Nizzo Kaboss"
| rowspan="1"| 2015
| Gilbert Benjamins & Kent-P
|-
! scope="row"| "Nyampinga"
| rowspan="1"| 2016
| Gilbert Benjamins & Kent-P
|-
! scope="row"| "African Girl"
| rowspan="1"| 2016
| Meddy Menz & Kent-P
|-
! scope="row"| "I Love You ft Urban Boyz"
| rowspan="1"| 2016
| Grate Pest
|-
! scope="row"| "Too Much"
| rowspan="1"| 2017
| Kent-P
|-
! Scope="row"| "Ivyo Bintu Ft Magic Washington"
| rowspan="1"| 2017
| Kent-P
|-
! scope="row"| "Feel Love"
| rowspan="1"| 2017
| Sasha Vybz
|-
! scope="row"| "No Love"
| rowspan="1"| 2018
| Joowzey
|-
! scope="row"| "Karabarya"
| rowspan="1"| 2018
| Sasha Vybz
|-
! scope="row"| "50–100 (Amabuno) ft Best Life Music, Belle 9ice, Clementine Kavy and Bain Turo"
| rowspan="1"| 2019
| Kent-P
|-
! scope="row"| "Love Controller"
| rowspan="1"| 2019
| Taty Lameck

Featuring videos
 Katoto Rmx by Dj Pro ft Mkombozi
 Stay With Me by Alida B
Me & You by Esther Nish
Only One by Mt Number One ft Sat-B
Sweet Darling by Bahati ft Sat-B

Awards

Karisimbi Entertainment Awards

|-
| rowspan="1"|2022
|Sat-B
|Best African Male Artist 
|
|-

African Muzik Magazine Awards 

|-
| rowspan="1"|2022
|Sat-B
|Best Male East Africa  
|
|-

East Africa Entertainment Awards 

|-
| rowspan="1"|2022
|Sat-B
|Artiste of the year, Burundi 
|
|-

HAPA AWARDS 

|-
| rowspan="1"|2021
|Sat-B
|BEST INDEPENDENT TRADITIONAL MUSIC
|
|-

Hi Skool Awards 

|-
| rowspan="1"|2020
|Sat-B
|EAST AFRICA'S CHAMPION OF THE YEAR
|
|-

Buja Music Awards

Afrima

|-
| rowspan="1"|2016
|Sat-B
|Most Promising Artist
|
|-

Ikoh Multiservice

|-
| rowspan="1"|2014
|Sat-B
|Artist of the Year
|
|-

Top Ten Tube Music Awards

|-
| rowspan="1"|2013
|Ikinyamugigima
|Video of the Year
|
|-

Radio Achievement

References

External links
 Sat-B on Facebook

1989 births
Living people
Burundian male singers